NGC 6056 is a barred lenticular galaxy located about 525 million light-years away in the constellation Hercules. It was discovered by astronomer Lewis Swift on June 8, 1886. It was then rediscovered by Swift on June 8, 1888 and was later listed as IC 1176. NGC 6056 is a member of the Hercules Cluster.

See also
 List of NGC objects (6001–7000)

References

External links

6056
57075
Hercules (constellation)
Hercules Cluster
Astronomical objects discovered in 1886
Barred lenticular galaxies
IC objects